Ana G. Egge (born September 20, 1976, in Estevan, Saskatchewan, Canada) is a Canadian/American musician and songwriter.

Egge grew up the daughter of a teacher and a wheat farmer in Ambrose, North Dakota, and later moved to Silver City, New Mexico. She spent some of her childhood traveling back and forth from North Dakota to a hot springs commune in New Mexico.

When Egge was 16 years old, she began a one-year apprenticeship with luthier Don Musser, to build her own guitar which she still plays exclusively.

She currently lives in Brooklyn, New York.

Career
The early songs she wrote were soon noted by bassist Sarah Brown (Albert Collins, Bonnie Raitt) and guitarist Steve James, who persuaded her to record the 1994 cassette EP of her original songs in Austin, Texas. This EP led to a recording contract with Lazy S.O.B. Recordings and the release of her first full-length album, River Under The Road. The title track was co-written by Egge, Sarah Brown and Jimmie Dale Gilmore. The following year, the Austin Music Awards named Egge, then nineteen, their "Best Singer/Songwriter" and "Best Folk Artist".

Next Egge was invited on tour by Jimmie Dale Gilmore, Iris DeMent, Shawn Colvin and Ron Sexsmith. She recorded her first live album Mile Marker on her solo tour in 1999.  She later shared the stage with John Prine, Lucinda Williams, George Jones and Sinéad O'Connor among others. After a few years of constant touring, Egge returned to Silver City, New Mexico where she began building her own house in the desert and spending time with family.  In 2002, after writing some of the songs for her next record, Egge resettled in Brooklyn, New York.

In Brooklyn she met bassist Jason Mercer (Ani DiFranco, Ron Sexsmith) and they began recording demos of Egge's new songs. Singer-songwriter Ron Sexsmith, guitarist Tony Scherr and trumpeter Shane Endsley joined their efforts and the result was Out Past the Light  which received critical acclaim. "Listen to the lyrics," Lucinda Williams urged an audience one night after the album was out. "She's a folk Nina Simone."

Egge's Lazy Days was released on November 13, 2007.  It is an album made up of cover songs on the theme of laziness. Songs include The Kinks' "Sitting in the Midday Sun", Arcade Fire's "In the Backseat", The Zombies' "I Could Spend a Day" and Belle and Sebastian's "Summer Wastin' ". Though all songs on the album were written by others, "Egge makes them her own through her distinctively laid-back approach. She drawls out the lyrics like a yawn, but the kind that settles in your soul like a sigh."

In July 2007 she won The Mountain Stage New Song Regional Competition in New York City.

Egge released her sixth record, Road to My Love, in February 2009. The record was co-produced by Egge and her longtime collaborator Jason Mercer and includes guest musicians Steve Moore, Michael Jerome, Frazey Ford and Trish Klein of The Be Good Tanyas, Adam Levy and Tony Scherr.

She also appears as a guest musician on Joel Plaskett's 2009 album Three and has performed as a backup singer and musician and as a solo artist on his 'Three' world tour.

Egge released her seventh record, Bad Blood, on August 23, 2011.  The record was produced by Steve Earle and recorded at Levon Helm's studio in Woodstock, New York and was released by Danny Goldberg's Ammal Records.

In 2015 Egge released Bright Shadow, an all acoustic, intimate album produced by Egge herself and engineered by long-time friend and collaborator Steve Addabbo featuring The Stray Birds as her back-up band on mandolin, fiddle, banjo, upright bass, dobro and harmony vocals.

In 2016 Egge collaborated with the Danish indie-folk band The Sentimentals on Say That Now. Co-written and co-produced by Egge and The Sentimentals, recorded in Copenhagen, DK.

In 2018 Egge signed with the NYC based label StorySound Records. Her first release with the label was a single, We Are One. Produced by Stewart Lerman and co-written by Gary Nicholson it features Steve Holley (Wings) and Paul Socolow (David Byrne).

In 2018 Egge released White Tiger. Produced by Alec Spiegelman and features Buck Meek (Big Thief), Anais Mitchel (Hadestown) and Billy Strings.

Egge released her eleventh full-length album Is It The Kiss in 2019. It was produced by Alec Spiegelman and features Iris DeMent, Buck Meek (Big Thief) and Matt Davidson (Twain).

In 2019 Egge released a live recording of her previously released song, We Are One. Produced by Stewart Lerman and co-written by Gary Nicholson it features The Brooklyn Unitarian Choir, Arthur Vint and Jacob Silver.

Egge's songs have been recorded by Dave Alvin, Laurie Lewis, Maya DeVitry, Laura Cortese & The Dance Cards and Matt the Electrician.

Her songs have been featured on the TV shows I'm from Rolling Stone (MTV) and Shameless (Showtime).

Egge is the subject of a full-length documentary directed by Jesse Lyda titled Bright Shadow released in 2015.

Discography
 Ana Egge (1994) -EP Grace Records
River Under the Road (1997) Lazy S.O.B.
 Mile Marker (1999) Grace Records/Parkinsong
 101 Sundays (2000) Sodarock/Grace Records
 Out Past the Lights (2004) Grace Records/Parkinsong
 Lazy Days (2007) Grace Records/Parkinsong
 Road to My Love (2009) Grace Records/Parkinsong
 Bad Blood (2011) Ammal Records
 Bright Shadow (2015) Grace Records/Parkinsong
 Say That Now with The Sentimentals (2016) Grace Records/Sentimental Music
We Are One (2018) single – StorySound Records
White Tiger (2018) StorySound Records
Is It The Kiss (2019) StorySound Records
We Are One (2019) live single feat. The Brooklyn Unitarian Choir – StorySound Records
This Time (2020) single - – StorySound Records
The Ship (2020) single - – StorySound Records
Between Us (2021) StorySound Records

Compilations
 Forever Dusty – A Tribute to Dusty Springfield (1998): "Breakfast in Bed"
 38 Songs of Hope – Parkingsong (2004): "Wedding Dress"'
 My Old Man: A Tribute to Steve Goodman (2006): "Old Fashioned Girl"'

Guest appearances
 Roberto Moreno, One Possible Explanation (1998)
 Matt the Electrician, Baseball Song (1998)
Kelly Hogan & The Pine Valley Cosmonauts, Beneath The Country Underdog (2000)
 Ron Sexsmith, Blue Boy (2001)
 Tandy, To a Friend (2006)
 Nels Andrews, Off Track Betting (2007)
 Rose Polenzani, When the River Meets the Sea (2008)
 Joel Plaskett, Three (2009)
 Good Luck Mountain, Good Luck Mountain (2011)
Good Luck Mountain, Good Luck Mountain Too (2014)
Matt Patershuk, I Was So Fond Of You (2016)
Matt Patershuk, Same As I Ever Have Been (2017)
Dick Connette, Too Sad for the Public Vol. 1 Oysters Ice Cream Lemonade (2017)
The RT's, The RT's (2021)

References

External links

1976 births
Living people
People from Estevan
Canadian people of Norwegian descent
American singer-songwriters
American women singer-songwriters
American folk musicians
Musicians from Saskatchewan
Guitarists from North Dakota
People from Silver City, New Mexico
21st-century American singers
21st-century American women singers
21st-century American guitarists
21st-century American women guitarists